HEAnet is the national education and research network of Ireland.

HEAnet's e-infrastructure services support approximately 210,000 students and staff (third-level) in Ireland, and approximately 800,000 students and staff (first and second-level) relying on the HEAnet network. In total, the network supports approximately 1 million users.

Established in 1983 by a number of Irish universities, and supported by the Higher Education Authority, HEAnet provides e-infrastructure services to schools, colleges and universities within the Irish education system. Its network connects Irish universities, Institutes of technology in Ireland, the Irish Centre for High-End Computing (National Supercomputing Centre) and other higher education institutions (HEIs). It also provides internet services to primary and post-primary schools in Ireland and research organisations. Their clients also include various state-sponsored bodies, including hosting the online live conferencing service of the Oireachtas, the parliament of Ireland.

HEAnet also hosts a mirror service, which acts as a mirror for projects such as SourceForge, Debian, and Ubuntu.

In 2014, HEAnet hosted the TERENA Conference in Dublin. It was held between 19 and 22 May 2014 in Dublin.

In 2017, HEAnet announced additional investment in "100Gbps [services] to boost bandwidth accessed by [...] 216 academic locations around Ireland".

References

External links 
 
 HEAnet network map

Education in the Republic of Ireland
Internet in Ireland
Internet mirror services
National research and education networks